In Heat is the third studio album by Love Unlimited. Released in 1974, the album charted at number 15 on the U.S. R&B charts. The single, "I Belong To You", was a number-one hit on the U.S. R&B charts in 1975.

Track listing
All tracks composed by Barry White; except where indicated
 "Move Me No Mountain" - (Jerry Ragovoy, Aaron Schroeder)  3:55
 "Share a Little Love in Your Heart" - 5:53
 "Oh I Should Say, It's Such a Beautiful Day" - 3:30
 "I Needed Love - You Were There" - 3:47
 "I Belong to You" - 5:07
 "I Love You So, Never Gonna Let You Go" - 3:20
 "Love's Theme" - (music by Barry White, lyrics by Aaron Schroeder)  3:59

Charts

Singles

References

External links
 Love Unlimited-In Heat at Discogs

1974 albums
Love Unlimited albums
20th Century Fox Records albums